The Capitoline Wolf is a monument in Central Chișinău, Moldova. It is located in front of the National History Museum of Moldova.

Overview
During the first decades of the 20th century, Kingdom of Italy donated to Kingdom of Romania five copies of the Capitoline Wolf, which were installed in Chişinău (1921), Bucharest (1906), Cluj-Napoca (1921), Târgu Mureş (1924) and Timișoara (1926). In Chişinău, the monument was completed in 1923 and placed in front of Sfatul Țării Palace. In 1940, at the beginning of the Soviet occupation of Bessarabia and Northern Bukovina, the copy from Chişinău was destroyed.

In 1990, Romania donated a new copy of Capitoline Wolf to Moldova. This statue was unveiled in front of the National History Museum of Moldova on December 1, 1990.

Restoration 2005–2009
Soon after the 2005 election, the bronze statue was removed from its pedestal for restoration in April 2005. The monument was stored in the basement of the National History Museum and the restoration depended on the political context. The monument was re-unveiled just on December 1, 2009, a few months after July 2009 election, when the Alliance For European Integration pushed the Party of Communists into opposition.

Gallery

See also 
 Capitoline Wolf statues in cities

External links
 
 Romanian coins / Monede Româneşti - lupoaica cu Romulus şi Remus în numismatica românească
 Ministrul Culturii:«Monumentul s–a facut bucate»
 1992 postage stamp of Moldova with the Capitoline Wolf, Chişinău

1923 sculptures
Animal sculptures in Moldova
Bronze sculptures in Moldova
Cultural depictions of Romulus and Remus
Monuments and memorials in Chișinău
Sculpture series
Sculptures of classical mythology
She-wolf (Roman mythology)
Wolves in art